Singing the Blues (also reissued as Roll 'Em) is an album by blues vocalist Joe Turner recorded in 1967 and originally released by the BluesWay label.

Reception

AllMusic reviewer Scott Yanow stated "Backed by some top studio players of the era the 56-year old classic blues singer shows that he was still in prime form. Nothing too surprising occurs other than the fact that the ten songs are all Turner's originals. Best-known are the two vintage hits "Roll 'Em Pete" and "Cherry Red" while some of the newer tunes are more forgettable although still delivered with spirit.".

Track listing
All compositions by Joe Turner except where noted
 "Well Oh Well" − 3:21
 "Joe's Blues" − 5:16
 "Bluer Than Blue" − 2:48
 "Big Wheel" − 2:44
 "Poor House" − 4:50
 "Piney Brown Blues" (Joe Turner, Pete Johnson) − 4:12
 "Mrs. Geraldine" − 3:40
 "Since I Was Your Man" − 5:28
 "Roll 'Em Pete" (Turner, Johnson) − 2:48
 "Cherry Red" (Turner, Johnson) − 2:55

Personnel
Joe Turner − vocals
Buddy Lucas − tenor saxophone, harmonica
Thornel Schwartz, Wally Richardson − guitar
Patti Bown − piano
Bob Bushnell − bass
Herbie Lovelle (tracks 1, 2, 8 & 9), Panama Francis (Tracks 3-7 & 10) – drums

References

1967 albums
Big Joe Turner albums
Albums produced by Bob Thiele
BluesWay Records albums